Varden is a neighborhood (delområde) in the city of Stavanger which lies in the southwestern part of the large municipality of Stavanger in Rogaland county, Norway. It is located in the southern part of the borough of Storhaug, southeast of Paradis. Varden Church is located in this neighborhood.

References

Boroughs and neighbourhoods of Stavanger